"Looking Glass" is a single/EP by Canadian electronic rock band The Birthday Massacre. Unlike their previous single, "Red Stars", the Looking Glass EP is a physical release rather than a digital download available through iTunes.

It is the second single released for their second full-length album Walking With Strangers. This is also the fourth song to have a music video.

As well as including the title track, the EP includes remixes of "Red Stars", "Weekend", and "Falling Down" from the album Walking with Strangers. There are also two new songs: "I Think We're Alone Now", originally recorded by Tommy James and the Shondells but popularized by Tiffany in the late 1980s, and "Shiver". In addition, the EP includes the ambient track "Nowhere" which is a re-recording of "The Night Loop" (which was the background music to the band's website). Lastly the EP contains the music video for "Looking Glass" in QuickTime format.

Track listing

Personnel
 Chibi – lead vocals
 Rainbow – rhythm guitar, backing vocals, synth, percussion programming
 Michael Falcore – lead guitar, synth, percussion programming
 O.E. –  bass, backing vocals
 Rhim –  drums
 Owen –  keyboards

Chart positions

References

2008 EPs
The Birthday Massacre albums